The Centenary Suburbs are a group of suburbs in the south-west in the City of Brisbane, Queensland, Australia. The suburbs originated as an "ambitious long-term suburban development proposal that included a number of neighbourhoods, or suburbs, each with sufficient services and facilities for its residents to have their day-to-day needs met without having to go elsewhere".

History 
The area was given its name by land developer Hooker Rex in 1959, Queensland's centenary year that marked its separation from New South Wales in 1859. All suburbs have the postcode of 4074. Originally the land was all known as Jindalee, indeed the 1967/68 Australian Scout Jamboree, held in what is now Jamboree Heights, is recorded as being held in Jindalee.

The western part of the original land holdings that became the Centenary Suburbs were part of the Wolston Estate, consisting of 54 farms on an area of 3000 acres, offered for auction at Centennial Hall, Brisbane, on 16 October 1901. Wolston Estate is the property of M. B. Goggs, whose father obtained the land forty years previously in the 1860s and after whom Goggs Road is named. Only three of the farms sold at the original auction.

From 1960 onwards Jindalee was progressively broken up into smaller suburbs, being:

 Jindalee
 Mount Ommaney
 Jamboree Heights
 Middle Park
 Westlake
 Riverhills
 Sumner

While originally referring to new suburbs west of Centenary Highway, the descriptor of 'Centenary Suburbs' is now arguably applied to include also the new residential areas developed on the eastern side of that highway, namely Sinnamon Park and Seventeen Mile Rocks (postcode 4073).

History

Prior to the commencement of planning for Hooker's Centenary Project in 1959, the area was largely used for grazing and dairy farming. The area was severely damaged in the 1974 floods, including structural damage to the Centenary Bridge after a barge became stuck under the upstream side of the then two-lane bridge. The barge was deliberately holed using explosives and allowed to sink to reduce the floodwater pressure, before being refloated after the flood waters had receded and beached near Fig Tree Pocket to be cut up for scrap. The damage sustained by the bridge required its partial closure for repairs, prior to its duplication in 1980.

Environmental Protection

As residential expansion progressed, the 1990s saw the rise of community efforts to preserve riverfront bushland along the Brisbane River and encourage environmental protection of remnant natural areas in the Centenary Suburbs. The first groups which formed to forge this greater interest in grassroots environmental protection were:
 Save Our Riverfront Bushland (SORB), established Sep 1991;
 Westlake-Riverhills Bushcare Group, established1993; and
 Centenary and District Environment Action Inc, established 1996.

Westlake-Riverhills Bushcare Group (WRBG) was the first community-based, volunteer-run bushland rehabilitation group to be established in the Centenary Suburbs. WRBG commenced operations in 1993 at its site at Pullen Reach, under the auspices of Brisbane City Council through a program that came to be known as Habitat Brisbane.

By the late 1990s, additional local Habitat Brisbane bushland rehabilitation groups began to flourish, and by 2010 there were around a dozen such groups in the Centenary Suburbs and the surrounding south-western suburbs of Brisbane.

In 2008, a community-based catchment group, Wolston and Centenary Catchments (WaCC), was formed. Since May 2014, WaCC has been operating from its base at the Pooh Corner Environment Centre (PCEC). This facility is located at the Wolston Road frontage to the Pooh Corner Bushland Reserve.

The formation and activities of the above-mentioned groups in the Centenary Suburbs has fulfilled, in part, certain observations by conservation ecologist, Peter Young, who stated in 1990:
While it is unrealistic to suppose that there will be any large-scale rehabilitation or regeneration of land to something approaching its natural condition in the foreseeable future, some small tracts of land in the lower reaches (of the Brisbane River) deserve better care than they currently receive. ... Initiatives for the rehabilitation and care of such areas have to come from local communities, not government bodies, to be effective.
Indeed, Young specifically identified remnant vegetation pockets both within, and upstream of, the Centenary Suburbs, including a rainforest fragment then still present on a small tributary below Mt Ommaney. That particular remnant vegetation fragment is adjacent to the site where the Jindalee Bushcare Group established and continues to operate. That group's site encompasses the Mount Ommaney walkway, which skirts the slope below the prominent hill that bears the same name, and is adjacent to Mount Ommaney Creek, near its confluence with the Brisbane River.

Public transport

The following bus routes service all or part of the Centenary Suburbs:

 103 - Mount Ommaney - Inala : Local via Darra (Every day) (BT)
 106 - Mount Ommaney - Indooroopilly : Local via Sinnamon Park, Seventeen Mile Rocks, Oxley, Corinda, Sherwood, Graceville and Chelmer (Monday-Saturday) (BT)
 450 - City - Riverhills : CityXpress via Cultural Centre, Coronation Drive, Toowong, Indooroopilly, Jindalee, Mount Ommaney, Jamboree Heights, Middle Park and Westlake (Weekends) (BT)
 451 - Mount Ommaney - Darra Station : Link via Sinnamon Park (Weekdays - Peak Hours Only) (BT)
 452 - Riverhills - Darra Station : Loop via Middle Park (Weekdays - Peak Hours Only) (BT)
 453 - City - Mount Ommaney : CityXpress via Cultural Centre, Coronation Drive, Toowong, Indooroopilly and Jindalee (Weekdays) (BT)
 454 - City - Riverhills : CityXpress via Cultural Centre, Coronation Drive, Toowong, Indooroopilly, Mount Ommaney, Jamboree Heights, Middle Park and Westlake (Weekdays) (BT)
 455 - City - Riverhills : Rocket via Legacy Way, Western Freeway, Mount Ommaney, Jamboree Heights, Middle Park and Westlake (Weekdays - Peak Hours only) (BT)
 456 - City - Mount Ommaney : Rocket via Legacy Way, Western Freeway and Jindalee (Weekdays - Peak Hours only) (BT)
 457 - City - Riverhills : City Precincts via Coronation Drive, Western Freeway, Jindalee, Mount Ommaney, Jamboree Heights, Middle Park and Westlake (Weekdays - Peak Hours only) (BT)
 458 - City - Mount Ommaney : City Precincts via Coronation Drive, Western Freeway and Jindalee. (Weekdays - Peak Hours only) (BT)
 459 - City - Riverhills : City Precincts via Coronation Drive, Western Freeway, Mount Ommaney, Jamboree Heights, Middle Park and Westlake (Weekdays - Peak Hours only) (BT)
 460 - City - Forest Lake & Inala : CityXpress via Cultural Centre, Coronation Drive, Toowong, Indooroopilly and Mount Ommaney (Every day) (BT)
 N464 - City & Valley - Forest Lake : NightLink via Fortitude Valley, City, Milton, Toowong, Indooroopilly and Mount Ommaney (Late night Friday - Saturday only) (BT)

Schools

There are three state primary schools, one private primary school and one state high school in the Centenary suburbs, being:

References